The 1985/86 FIS Nordic Combined World Cup was the third World Cup season, a combination of ski jumping and cross-country skiing organized by International Ski Federation. It started on 21 Dec 1985 in Tarvisio, Italy and ended on 22 March 1986 in Štrbské Pleso, Czechoslovakia.

Calendar

Men

Standings

Overall

Nations Cup

References

External links 
FIS Nordic Combined World Cup 1985/86 

1985 in Nordic combined
1986 in Nordic combined
FIS Nordic Combined World Cup